Times and Winds  or  is a 2006 Turkish drama film directed and written by Reha Erdem. The film premiered in the United States on January 11, 2008. It won the Best Turkish Film of the Year Award at the Istanbul International Film Festival.

Plot
In a small village in the mountains overlooking the sea the people struggle to survive on a daily basis. Their lives, like those of their ancestors, follow the rhythms of the earth, air and water, of day and night and the seasons, with days divided into five parts by the call to prayer. Childhood is difficult and a father typically has a preference of one son over the other. Ömer, the son of the Imam, is such a victim of his father's dislike and he wishes for the death of his father. When his wish is not granted he begins to look for ways to kill him as a twelve-year-old boy might think of with his friend Yakup. Yakup seeing his father sexually interested in his teacher also develops a hatred of his father in the same way and as the children grow up they are riddled between guilt and love and hate for their fathers.

Cast
Taner Birsel as Zekeriya
Nihan Aslı Elmas as Yıldız's Mother
Köksal Engür as Halil Dayi
Sevinç Erbulak as Yakup's Mother
Selma Ergeç as The Teacher
Elit İşcan as Yıldız
Ali Bey Kayalı as Yakup
Yiğit Özşener as Yusuf
Tilbe Saran as Ömer's Mother
Tarık Sönmez as Shepherd Davut
Cüneyt Türel as Grandfather
Bülent Yarar as Imam

External links

Official site

Turkish drama films
2006 films
2000s Turkish-language films
2006 drama films
Best Picture Golden Boll Award winners
Films set in Turkey